Milovka is a rural locality (a selo) and the administrative centre of Milovsky Selsoviet, Ufimsky District, Bashkortostan, Russia. The population was 2,767 as of 2010. There are 68 streets.

Geography 
Milovka is located 16 km northwest of Ufa (the district's administrative centre) by road. Zaton is the nearest rural locality.

References 

Rural localities in Ufimsky District